Plage may refer to:

Plage (astronomy), a bright region in the chromosphere of the Sun
Plage (mycology), a clear, unornamented area on the basal area of an ornamented fungal spore
"Plage" (song), a 2011 song by English electronic band Crystal Fighters
Beach, a translation from the French